Blue Neighbourhood is the debut studio album by Australian singer Troye Sivan. It was released internationally on 4 December 2015 via EMI Music Australia and Capitol Records America. The album is preceded by Sivan's fourth extended play Wild, which served as a 6-song opening installment to Blue Neighbourhood.

The album has generated the singles "Wild", "Youth", "Talk Me Down" and "Heaven". "Wild" was ultimately remixed and re-released as a single with Alessia Cara.

Release and promotion 
On 13 October 2015, Sivan revealed that Wild served as an opening introduction to the album. Pre-orders for the album opened on 15 October 2015, with the album reaching No. 1 within hours on the iTunes Store in ten countries, including the United States. "Talk Me Down" was included as a promotional single to those who pre-ordered the album and was the only previously unreleased song made available before release. Those who had already purchased Wild received a discount to purchase Blue Neighbourhood. Sivan also launched merchandise bundles on his site, selling jumpers with the album logo, candles scented to match the mood of his songs, CDs, vinyl, posters, digital downloads, bags, and notebooks. On 22 May, Sivan performed at the 2016 Billboard Music Awards. On 28 August, Sivan performed at the pre-show of the 2016 MTV Video Music Awards. Sivan embarked on two concert tours to promote the album: the first is the Blue Neighbourhood Tour and later the Suburbia Tour.

Composition 
Blue Neighbourhood has been described to be an electropop, gloom-pop, and synth-pop record with EDM, electronic music, electro, and R&B elements. Lyrical themes within the record include Sivan's experiences with love, youth, yearning, heartbreak, and affirmation. Critics have also compared the record to other musicians like Lorde, Taylor Swift, Sam Smith, Macklemore, and Adele.

Singles 
"Wild", originally released as the lead single from Sivan's extended play of the same name, was issued a remixed version featuring Canadian singer-songwriter Alessia Cara and was later released as the fourth single from the album on 23 June 2016. Following its release, Sivan re-released Blue Neighbourhood on iTunes, replacing "Wild (XXYYXX remix)" with the remixed version featuring Cara on the deluxe edition and adding it to the standard version as the last track. In addition, a Korean Special Edition of the album was released, featuring the TRXYE extended play tracks, the Blue Neighbourhood music video trilogy and the music video for "Youth".

"Youth" was released as the second single from the album. The song premiered exclusively on 12 November on Shazam Top 20 at 7PM AEST and was officially released worldwide after midnight in each country on 13 November. In early 2016, it reached the top 25 on the Billboard Hot 100, making it Sivan's most commercially successful single to date in North America.

"Talk Me Down" was later confirmed to be the third single from the album, being released on 26 May 2016.

On 17 October 2016, "Heaven" featuring fellow Australian singer Betty Who was released as the fifth single from the album. Sivan uploaded the audio for the song to his vevo channel on YouTube and performed a solo version of the song on The Ellen DeGeneres Show the next day. The official music video for the song was set to be released on 20 January 2017 in order to coincide with the inauguration of Donald Trump, however, the video was released on Sivan's Vevo channel on 19 January, one day earlier than planned.

Music videos
Prior to the album's announcement, the same day the Wild EP came out, a music video trilogy labelled under the umbrella term Blue Neighbourhood was confirmed. The trilogy follows the storyline of Sivan and his fictional childhood friend and love interest (played by Australian model Matthew Eriksson), and the struggles their same-sex relationship faces. The first two installments are for the songs "Wild" and "Fools" and both were released in September 2015. The last installment of the Blue Neighbourhood video trilogy is for "Talk Me Down" and was released on 20 October 2015. The video has an open ending, since it leaves the viewer with a shot of Sivan's love interest at the edge of a cliff and then cuts to a view of the sea. After the release of this installment, Sivan provided suicide prevention hotlines (for countries where they are available).

In December 2015, Sivan shared some giveaways with his fans for a whole week until Christmas through a website called 8 Days of Givaways. On 23 December 2015, the giveaway was a few black-and-white pictures from behind the scenes for the "Youth" music video. That music video was never released, and a new one was shot instead in early February 2016 and released on 24 February 2016.

Sivan confirmed that he filmed a music video for "Wild" with Alessia Cara in late June 2016.

On 19 January 2017, Sivan released a music video for "Heaven", however Betty Who was not seen in the music video, but her vocals were featured on the track.

Critical reception

The album received critical acclaim from music critics. At Metacritic, which assigns a normalised rating out of 100 to reviews from mainstream critics, the album received an average score of 80, based on 4 reviews, indicating "generally favourable reviews". Everett True from The Guardian gave the album five stars, commenting that "it is difficult to find fault with Blue Neighbourhood" and praising Sivan for "capturing the sound of now so well". Neil Z. Yeung from AllMusic praised Sivan's "sultry and effortless, wounded and breathless" voice as well as noting the album's themes of "heartbreak and affirmation" that make it "a sparkling, triumphant experience". Writing for Billboard, Kenneth Partridge commented that "in lieu of originality, Sivan sells vulnerability" as well as comparing the album's instrumentation to those of Lorde and Taylor Swift. Bernard Zuel from The Sydney Morning Herald described Sivan as having a "coffee-and-cream voice [...] artfully caught between childhood and adulthood."

Writers for Herald Sun praised Sivan's voice, calling it "fearless and honest in a way most pop stars aren't" as well as noting the openness of the album's lyrical content that does "not [shy] away from pronouns like many before him." Jules Lefevre from Rolling Stone Australia commenting that Sivan's vocals "[hover] amid electronic production that manages to be densely intricate and helium light" and that he "delivers these quiet gems of young wisdom with enough humility so as to be endearing rather than precocious."

Accolades 
{| class="wikitable"
|-
! Award
! Category
! Recipients and nominees
! Result
|-
| MTV Video Music Awards
| Breakthrough Long Form Video
| Blue Neighbourhood Trilogy
| 
|-
| rowspan="7"| ARIA Music Awards of 2016
| Album of the Year
| rowspan="3"| Blue Neighbourhood
| rowspan="3" 
|-
| Best Male Artist
|-
| Best Pop Release
|-
| Song of the Year
| "Youth"
| rowspan="2" 
|-
| Best Video 
| "Youth" Acoustic (Sydney Session)'|-
| Producer of the Year
| rowspan="2"| Alex Hope for Troye Sivan – Blue Neighbourhood| rowspan="2" 
|-
| Engineer of the Year
|-
|}

 Commercial performance Blue Neighbourhood'' debuted at number six in Australia and seven in the United States, selling 65,000 album-equivalent units (55,000 coming from pure album sales), becoming his third release to debut inside the top ten. In the United States that was his best sales week, despite having the lowest peak of all his albums and EPs.

Track listing

Charts

Weekly charts

Year-end charts

Certifications and sales

References

2015 debut albums
Albums produced by Alex Hope (songwriter)
Albums produced by Emile Haynie
Capitol Records albums
Troye Sivan albums
Visual albums
Universal Music Australia albums
Universal Music Group albums